María Sorté (born María Harfuch Hidalgo on May 11, 1955 in Camargo, Chihuahua, Mexico) is a Mexican actress and singer.

Biography 
Sorté was born May 11, 1955, in Camargo, Chihuahua, Mexico. Her parents were José Harfuch Stefano and Celia Hidalgo. She came to Mexico City to study medicine. With her husband, Javier García Paniagua (a politician), she has two sons –  Omar and Adrian. Javier died of a heart attack. Omar García Harfuch is the Chief of Police in Mexico City. She has six grandchildren.

Filmography

Film

Television

References 

1955 births
Living people
Mexican telenovela actresses
Mexican people of Lebanese descent
Mexican television actresses
Mexican film actresses
Mexican stage actresses
Mexican women singers
Actresses from Chihuahua (state)
Singers from Chihuahua (state)
20th-century Mexican actresses
21st-century Mexican actresses
People from Camargo, Chihuahua